Siewiller is a commune in the Bas-Rhin department in Grand Est in north-eastern France.

See also
 Communes of the Bas-Rhin department

References

Communes of Bas-Rhin
Bas-Rhin communes articles needing translation from French Wikipedia